Lariboisière Hospital is a hospital in the 10th arrondissement of Paris, France.

The hospital was one of several built following the second cholera pandemic, which had reached Paris in 1832, and which led to a new emphasis on hygienic practices in hospitals. It was built from 1846 to 1853 under architect Pierre Gauthier, with six buildings arranged around a central courtyard, connected by colonnaded walkways.

It is a teaching hospital of Université Paris Cité.

References

Hospitals in Paris
Hospital buildings completed in 1853
Hospitals established in 1853
Buildings and structures in the 10th arrondissement of Paris